Vincent Desportes (born 24 February 1953) is a retired French Army general and military theorist.

Desportes graduated from the École spéciale militaire de Saint-Cyr, specialising in armour warfare. He also holds an engineer's degree, a diplôme d'études approfondies in sociology, a MBA, and graduated from the U.S. Army War College.

He was Military attaché in the French embassy in the USA, aid to the General secretary for national defence, and director of the Centre de doctrine et d'emploi des forces.

Along with Jean-Francois Phelizon, Desportes is co-director of the "Stratégies & Doctrines" collection of Economica editions.

Desportes headed the Collège interarmées de défense in 2008-2010.

Honours 
Officer of the Legion of Honour
Officer of the National Order of Merit
Knight of the Order of Arts and Literature
Badge of Honour of the Bundeswehr (Germany)
Officer of the Legion of Merit (USA)
Meritorious Service Medal (USA)

Works

Books 
 Cavalerie de décision, ADDIM, 1998, 
 Comprendre la guerre, Economica, 2000, 2e édition en 2001,  Prix Fréville de l'Académie des Sciences Morales et Politiques  Prix Vauban de l'Association des Auditeurs de l'IHEDN
 L'Amérique en Armes, Economica, 2002, 
 Décider dans l'incertitude, Economica, 2004, 2e édition en 2007,   English Translation Deciding in the Dark, Economica, 2008, 
 Introduction à la Stratégie, Economica, 2007, 
 La Guerre Probable, Economica, 2007,     Prix de la Saint-Cyrienne 2008  English Translation  Tomorrow’s War, Brookings Institution Press, 2009, 
 Le piège américain, Pourquoi les États-Unis peuvent perdre les guerres d'aujourd'hui, Economica, 2011, 
 La dernière bataille de France, Lettre aux Français qui croient encore être défendus, Gallimard, 2015,

Articles 
 Articles in Défense & Sécurité Internationale
 Articles in Défense et sécurité collective
 Several articles in Doctrine
 Article in Politique Etrangère (journal of the IFRI)
 Interview in Défense et Sécurité internationale (DSI)
 Article in Revue Militaire Suisse
 Interview in DefenseNews
 Interview in Le Monde
 Article in La Tribune
 Interview in Small War Journal
 Entretien in   Le Monde 07/02/2010

External links 
  Centre de doctrine et d'emploi des forces
  Collège interarmées de défense

Sources 
  Ens-Centre de géostratégie
  Ministry of Defence
  Biography

1953 births
Living people
Writers from Rennes
French generals
Military theorists
French military writers
École Spéciale Militaire de Saint-Cyr alumni
Officiers of the Légion d'honneur
Officers of the Ordre national du Mérite
Chevaliers of the Ordre des Arts et des Lettres
Recipients of the Badge of Honour of the Bundeswehr
Officers of the Legion of Merit
French male non-fiction writers
Military personnel from Rennes